Bethel Township is one of the ten townships of Clark County, Ohio, United States. The 2010 census reported 18,523 people living in the township, 12,440 of whom were in the unincorporated portions of the township.

Geography
Located in the southwestern corner of the county, it borders the following townships and city:
Pike Township - north
German Township - northeast
Springfield Township - east
Mad River Township - southeast
Bath Township, Greene County - south
Huber Heights - southwest
Bethel Township, Miami County - west

It is the only township in the county with a border on Montgomery County. The Mad River, a southwest-flowing tributary of the Great Miami River, forms the southeast border of the township.

Several populated places are located in Bethel Township:
Crystal Lakes, a census-designated place in the southwestern part of the township
Donnelsville, a village in the eastern part of the township
New Carlisle, a city in the northwestern corner of the township
Park Layne, a census-designated place in the southwestern part of the township
Medway, an unincorporated community east of Park Layne

Name and history
Statewide, other Bethel Townships are located in Miami and Monroe counties.

Government
The township is governed by a three-member board of trustees, who are elected in November of odd-numbered years to a four-year term beginning on the following January 1. Two are elected in the year after the presidential election and one is elected in the year before it. There is also an elected township fiscal officer, who serves a four-year term beginning on April 1 of the year after the election, which is held in November of the year before the presidential election. Vacancies in the fiscal officership or on the board of trustees are filled by the remaining trustees.

The board is composed of Chris Crowley (Chairman), Dave Phares, and Nancy Brown. The fiscal officer is Stacey McKenzie.

References

External links
Township website
County website

Townships in Clark County, Ohio
Townships in Ohio